Kaveh Rezaei is an Iranian professional footballer who plays as a striker for Iran national team.

Club career

Foolad
Rezaei started his career at Foolad. In the 2010–11 season, he scored one goal and provided two assists for his teammates in 16 games. During the next season, Rezaei played in 12 games starting in 4 and playing the whole 90 minutes in one of those games.

Saipa
Rezaei transferred to Saipa to gain more playing time in the 2012–13 season. Although he was not a regular starter, he managed to make 33 appearances, scoring 5 times against Saba, Paykan, Fajr Sepasi and Gahar. He also provided 2 assists during the season. During the 2014–15 season, Rezaei expressed that he does not intend to renew his contract with Saipa and the club transfer listed him in January to make money from his transfer.

Zob Ahan

On 28 December 2014, Rezaei joined Zob Ahan with an 18-month contract which would keep him until the end of 2015–16 season with the Isfahani side.

He made his debut for the club on 30 January 2015, in a 1–0 win against Persepolis in which he assisted Masoud Hassanzadeh's single goal of the game. The following week he scored his first goal for the club in a 3–0 away victory against Rah Ahan. On 16 April 2015, he scored a hat-trick in a 5–3 victory against Naft Tehran. He also featured in the 2015 Hazfi Cup Final where Zob Ahan beat Naft Tehran 3–1 to win the title in which Rezaei scored Zob Ahan's third goal.

Rezaei made his first appearance of the 2015–16 season against Malavan on the opening day of the Persian Gulf Pro League season. He scored his first goal of the season in 2–1 win against Persepolis. On 29 May 2016, Rezaei won the Hazfi Cup for the second consecutive time, playing 111 minutes in the final as Zob Ahan defeated Esteghlal 5–4 in penalties.

Esteghlal
On 16 June 2016, Rezaei refused to extend contract with Zob Ahan and signed a contract with Esteghlal. He later revealed that he had an offer from Persepolis before but rejected it due to personal reasons. He was handed the number 9 jersey that was previously held by Esteghlal's legend Arash Borhani.

Rezaei made his debut on 25 July 2016 in a 1–1 draw against Naft Tehran and he assisted Jaber Ansari's goal. In the next match on 31 July, he scored his first goal for Esteghlal in a 2–1 loss against Esteghlal Khuzestan. He scored a header in a 1–1 draw against Machine Sazi on 11 September. On 12 February 2017, Esteghlal defeated city rivals Persepolis 3–2, with Rezaei scoring the third goal. On 27 February 2017, in an AFC Champions League group-stage match against Al-Taawoun FC, he scored 53 seconds after kick-off; it was the fastest goal scored by an Iranian in an AFC Champions League match. On 11 April, he scored another champions league goal against Lokomotiv Tashkent to equalise the scoreline, as the game ended 1–1. In the following champions league game against Al-Ahli, the match finished at 1–1, where he scored another equaliser. On 4 May 2017, he assisted Jaber Ansari's goal in Esteghlal's 2–1 win against Sepahan. This assist made him the top provider in the league. He finished the season with 7 goals and 9 assists as Esteghlal finished the season as runners-up in the league. On 10 May, he scored and assisted in the champions league match against Al-Taawoun as Esteghlal beat their opponent 2–1 and qualified to the next round. On 22 May, he scored a late winning goal from the penalty spot against Al Ain the match finished 1–0.

Charleroi
On 14 June 2017, after rumours that he would sign a contract extension with Esteghlal, Rezaei signed a two-year contract, with an option to extend for another two years, with Belgian Pro League club Sporting Charleroi. He was assigned the shirt number 9.

2017–18 season 
Rezaei made his debut for the club in a 1–0 victory over Kortrijk on 29 June 2017, coming on as substitute for Chris Bedia. On 26 August, he scored his first goal for the club, against Zulte Waregem. Later in that match he scored his second goal to help win the match 3–2. After his stunning performance in September and scoring two goals in four games, Rezaei was voted as club's best player of the month by the fans. On 18 November, he scored a brace against KV Mechelen and dedicated his goals to his fellow citizens who suffered in earthquake.

2018–19 season 
Rezaei started the new season by scoring a brace in a 4–1 victory over Eupen.

Club Brugge
On 22 August 2018, Rezaei joined Club Brugge for a reported club-record fee of €5,000,000.

Return to Charleroi 
On 27 August 2019, he rejoined Charleroi on loan.

On 31 July 2020, he joined Charleroi on another season-long loan.

Oud-Heverlee Leuven 
On 4 August 2021, OH Leuven announced the signing of Rezaei for a one year deal with an option of an extra year.

International

Youth

U17

Rezaei finished as the top scorer of the 2008 AFC U-16 Championship scoring in every single game he played in and finishing with 6 goals in 5 games. Iran won the championship winning the final game 2–0 against South Korea.

Rezaei featured for Iran in the 2009 FIFA U-17 World Cup scoring a goal against Gambia.

U19
Rezaei also made the squad for the unsuccessful 2010 AFC U-19 Championship. Surprisingly his involvement was highly limited under the guidance of his former U17 manager, Ali Doustimehr. However, he started in Iran's last game of the group stages, scoring both goals in the game and helping to record Iran's only win of the tournament.

U23
In 2012, he broke in to coach Ali Reza Mansourian's squad and has been regular feature ever since. He was called up for the 2013 AFC U-22 Championship, where he was the leading goalscorer after the group stage with 5 goals in 3 matches, including a hat trick in his last game. He named in Iran U23 final list for Incheon 2014.

Senior

Rezaei received his first call-up to the senior side on 30 August 2015 replacing injured Alireza Jahanbakhsh. He made his debut against India during Iran's 2018 World Cup Qualification campaign on 8 September 2015. After a 2-year absence from the international side, Rezaei received another call-up on 1 October 2017 to play for Iran in friendlies against Togo and Russia. On 17 March 2018, he scored his first international goal in a 4–0 victory against Sierra Leone. In May 2018, he was named in Iran's preliminary squad for the 2018 World Cup in Russia but did not make the final 23.

Style of play
A hardworking, skillful and creative forward, who is good in the air and is known for his great striking ability. A typical number 9, Rezaei been used on the wings through his career. Charleroi teammate and French goalkeeper Nicolas Penneteau heaped praise towards Rezaei, calling him "a complete striker".

Personal life
In May 2017, Rezaei married with Iran women's national volleyball team player Farnoosh Sheikhi. His father in law, Fereydoun Sheikhi was killed in a plane crash in January 2019.

His idol was Thiery Henry. He is a friend to Mehdi Rahmati, Bakhtiar Rahmani and Soroush Rafiei. He cites Navid Mohammadzadeh as his favourite actor. He can speak Persian and Kurdish fluently.

Career statistics

Club

1 Includes AFC Champions League matches.
2 Includes Iranian Super Cup and Belgian First Division A Championship Playoff.

International

International goals
Scores and results list Iran's goal tally first.

Honours

Club

Zob Ahan
Hazfi Cup: 2014–15, 2015–16

International
Iran U-16
AFC U-16 Championship: 2008

Individual
AFC U-16 Championship Top Scorer: 2008
AFC U-22 Championship Top Scorer: 2013
Persian Gulf Pro League Most Assists: 2016–17
Persian Gulf Pro League Team of the Year: 2016–17

References

External links
Official Facebook Page

1992 births
Living people
People from Eslamabad-e Gharb
Association football forwards
Iranian footballers
Iranian expatriate footballers
Kurdish sportspeople
Foolad FC players
Saipa F.C. players
Zob Ahan Esfahan F.C. players
Esteghlal F.C. players
R. Charleroi S.C. players
Club Brugge KV players
Oud-Heverlee Leuven players
Tractor S.C. players
Persian Gulf Pro League players
Belgian Pro League players
Iranian expatriate sportspeople in Belgium
Expatriate footballers in Belgium
Iran under-20 international footballers
Footballers at the 2014 Asian Games
Asian Games competitors for Iran